The bright emo skink or Rennell blue-tailed skink (Emoia rennellensis) is a species of lizard in the family Scincidae. It is found in the Solomon Islands.

References

Emoia
Reptiles described in 1991
Taxa named by Walter Creighton Brown